The 2011–12 Süper Lig (known as the Spor Toto Süper Lig for sponsorship reasons) was the 54th season of the Süper Lig, the top level football league of Turkey. Fenerbahçe were the defending champions. The start date of the league was due to be 7 August 2011, but due to the match fixing scandal in Turkey it began instead on 9 September 2011 and was concluded on 12 May 2012. Galatasaray won their 18th title. A new format was introduced this season, in which after the regular season two play-off groups were played to decide over the Champions League and Europa League starting rounds. Points of the regular season were halved for ranking in those.

Teams 

Bucaspor, Kasımpaşa and Konyaspor were relegated at the end of the 2010–11 season after finishing in the bottom three places of the standings.

The relegated teams were replaced by 2010–11 TFF First League champions Mersin İdmanyurdu, runners-up Samsunspor and Orduspor promotion play-off winners. Samsunspor returned to Süper Lig after 5 years of absence, and Mersin İdmanyurdu promoted to Turkey's top league after 28 years. Finally Orduspor returned to Süper Lig after 25 years of absence.

Team overview

Managerial changes

League table

Positions by round

Results

European play-offs

Championship group

Europa League group

2012–13 UEFA Europa League qualification play-off match
Beşiktaş (the fourth-placed team of the Champions League group) and the winners of the Europa League group would play for a spot in the second qualifying round of the 2012–13 UEFA Europa League. But the match was cancelled as Bursaspor, the 2011–12 Turkish Cup finalists against Champions League-qualified Fenerbahçe, wins the Europa League group. Bursaspor lost the cup final, and as a result, they qualified for the Europa League second qualifying round, and Beşiktaş qualified for the Europa League third qualifying round. But on 30 May 2012; UEFA banned Beşiktaş one year from UEFA competitions, so UEFA Europa League spots shifted down. Bursaspor were also initially banned from entering the Europa League, but this was overturned by the Court of Arbitration for Sport.

Spor Toto Cup

Group A

Group B

Spor Toto Cup Final

Top goalscorers
''Including play-off matches

Hat-tricks

References

2011-12
Turk
1